Filippa is a given name meaning "lover of horses" or "horses' friend". Common alternative spellings include Philippa, Phillippa or Filipa. It is the feminine form of the masculine name Philip in Scandinavia, Italy, Greece, Cyprus (Φιλίππα) and Russia (Филиппа) 

Notable people with the name Filippa include:

Filippa Duci -  Piedmontese noblewoman
Filippa Giordano - Italian crossover singer
Filippa Hamilton - Swedish-French model
Filippa Reinfeldt - Swedish politician

References

Italian feminine given names
Swedish feminine given names